Tacx Pro Classic is a professional road bicycle race in the Netherlands. The event is part of the UCI Europe Tour calendar of events with a ranking of 1.1.  While considered a new event, it can be seen as a successor to the Delta Tour Zeeland and Ronde van Zeeland Seaports.

Winners

References

Cycle races in the Netherlands
UCI Europe Tour races
Recurring sporting events established in 2017
2017 establishments in the Netherlands